The Haunting is an American television anthology series created by Mike Flanagan and produced by Amblin Television and Paramount Television, for Netflix. The first series, titled The Haunting of Hill House, premiered on October 12, 2018, and the second, titled The Haunting of Bly Manor, on October 9, 2020. Both series star Oliver Jackson-Cohen, Henry Thomas, Carla Gugino, Kate Siegel, and Victoria Pedretti, portraying different characters across the two seasons.

Production

The Haunting of Hill House 

The first series, titled The Haunting of Hill House, is loosely based on the 1959 novel of the same name by Shirley Jackson. The plot alternates between two timelines, following five adult siblings whose paranormal experiences at Hill House continue to haunt them in the present day, and flashbacks depicting events leading up to the eventful night in 1992 when the family fled from the mansion. The ensemble cast features Michiel Huisman, Elizabeth Reaser, Oliver Jackson-Cohen, Kate Siegel, and Victoria Pedretti as the adult counterparts of the siblings, with Carla Gugino and Henry Thomas as parents Olivia and Hugh Crain, and Timothy Hutton appearing as an older version of Hugh.

On April 10, 2017, Netflix announced that it had ordered a 10-episode adaptation of the classic horror novel The Haunting of Hill House, with Mike Flanagan and Trevor Macy as executive producers, and Amblin Television  and Paramount Television as co-production companies. It is the first scripted series to be made for Netflix by Amblin.

Production on the series began in October 2017 in Atlanta, Georgia, with location filming in the city and its environs. Bisham Manor, former name of the property located in LaGrange, served as the exterior of "Hill House." The house's interior settings were filmed at EUE/Screen Gem Studios in Atlanta.

The Haunting of Bly Manor 

On February 21, 2019, Netflix ordered a second installment of The Haunting anthology series, titled The Haunting of Bly Manor, to be based on The Turn of the Screw by Henry James. Though it would serve as a follow-up to The Haunting of Hill House, Bly Manor is a standalone story and that there would be "no dramatic link between The Haunting of Bly Manor and its predecessor."

The series stars recurring cast members Victoria Pedretti, Henry Thomas, Oliver Jackson-Cohen and Kate Siegel, along with T'Nia Miller, Catherine Parker, Rahul Kohli, Benjamin Evan Ainsworth, Amelie Smith and Amelia Eve. The nine-episode series was released on October 9, 2020. Although the prominent source for the adaptation is The Turn of the Screw, the season also adapts (some more loosely) multiple James works, some of which had never been adapted previously.

Future 
Following the release of The Haunting of Bly Manor, Flanagan confirmed on Twitter in December 2020 that there were "no plans for more chapters" of the series, though he added that he would keep fans informed "if things change".

Cast

Episodes

The Haunting of Hill House (2018)

The Haunting of Bly Manor (2020)

Reception

The Haunting of Hill House 

On Rotten Tomatoes, The Haunting of Hill House has a 93% rating based on 97 reviews, with an average rating of 8.46/10. The website's critical consensus reads, "The Haunting of Hill House is an effective ghost story whose steadily mounting anticipation is just as satisfying as its chilling payoff." On Metacritic, it has a weighted average score of 79 out of 100 based on 18 critics, indicating "generally favorable reviews."

The Haunting of Bly Manor 

On Rotten Tomatoes, The Haunting of Bly Manor has an 87% rating based on 94 reviews, with an average rating of 7.26/10. The critics consensus reads, "It may not be as scary as its predecessor, but with plenty of spooky tricks inside its haunted halls and a strong sense of heart, The Haunting of Bly Manor is another solid entry into Mike Flanagan's growing horrorography." On review aggregator Metacritic, The Haunting of Bly Manor received a score of 63 out of 100 based on 18 critical reviews, indicating "generally positive reviews".

References

External links
 
 
 The Haunting of Hill House at Amblin Television
 
 
 The Haunting of Bly Manor at Amblin Television

English-language Netflix original programming
2010s American anthology television series
2018 American television series debuts